

An oxbow is a U-shaped metal pole (or larger wooden frame) that fits the underside and the sides of the neck of an ox or bullock.  A bow pin holds it in place.

The term "oxbow" is widely used to refer to a U-shaped meander in a river, sometimes cut off from the modern course of the river that formed it.

Developed form

Its upper ends pass through a purpose-drilled hole through the bar of the yoke that is held in place into the yoke with a metal screw or key, called a bow pin. Where wood is used it is most often hardwood steamed into shape, especially elm, hickory or willow. A ring, enabling left/right movement controlled from the centre, is attached by a plate to the centre underside of a wooden yoke to enable a pair of bullocks/oxen to be chained to any other pairs in a team and to be hitched to the load behind the animal team.

Uses of the yoke and oxbows

The load is a plough or any other dragged, non-motorised, field agricultural machinery.

Alternative
Wooden staves can be used instead with a yoke, which is then termed a withers yoke, named after animals with high backs (withers) (e.g. zebu cattle) which pull mostly on the yoke part of the equipment, not as greatly on the bow shape borne by the stronger front quarters of oxen and bullocks.

See also 
 Oxbow lake
 Horse collar
 Yoke

References 

Animal equipment